The Esplanade Zagreb Hotel is a historic luxury hotel in Zagreb, Croatia. It was built in 1925 to provide accommodation for passengers of the famous Orient Express train, which traveled between Paris and Istanbul.

History

In 1917, an international tender was announced in which a number of prominent architects participated, including the famous Austrian architect Adolf Loos, who however was not awarded the contract. The winner was Germany's , whose original plans were modified by the Zagreb architect Dionis Sunko. Today, most people consider Sunko to have been the architect of this building from the Belle Epoque period. The hotel was given the name "Esplanade," which in its original form has the meaning "field", probably because it was built on a vast plain to the west of the station.
The hotel was the center of Zagreb social life, especially in the 1920s, when it attracted amorous couples. According to legend, the first Croatian striptease party was held there at a farewell celebration for an Italian count. Famous singers, including Ivo Robić, played in Hotel Esplanade.

During World War II, Esplanade was used by the Gestapo and the Wehrmacht.

On November 6, 1964, the hotel joined Pan Am's Inter-Continental Hotels chain, following a $1 million renovation, and was renamed Hotel Esplanade Intercontinental. In 1966, the name was adjusted slightly, to Hotel Esplanade Inter-Continental, when the chain was renamed. In 1967, a casino was opened. The brand-new Inter-Continental Zagreb (today The Westin Zagreb), opened in 1975 and the Esplanade left the chain at the same time. The hotel also received a medal from President Josip Broz Tito in 1975, with a golden wreath. Throughout the 20th century, the hotel was the site of key social events of the Croatian capital. 

Many world famous personalities have stayed there, including Charles Lindbergh, Josephine Baker, Laurence Olivier, Vivien Leigh, Woody Allen, Queen Elizabeth II, Richard Nixon, Nikita Khrushchev, Alfred Hitchcock, Louis Armstrong, Ella Fitzgerald, Catherine Deneuve, Orson Welles, Richard Burton, Yves Montand, Cliff Richard, Iron Maiden, Mick Jagger and The Rolling Stones, and Ike and Tina Turner.

The hotel was the filming site for the 1983 miniseries The Winds of War and the 1988 television film The Great Escape II: The Untold Story.

In the 1990s, the hotel was privatized, and in 2002 it was acquired by the Austrian WSF-Gruppe. The hotel closed in 2002 for a major renovation, and reopened on 18 May 2004 as The Regent Esplanade Zagreb. The hotel left the Regent chain in 2012 and operates independently since that year. In 2012, it was named the Best Hotel in Croatia in all three categories (the best hotel, the best service and the best luxury hotel) by TripAdvisor.

References

External links

 
Facebook Page

Hotels in Croatia
Buildings and structures in Zagreb
Donji grad, Zagreb
Hotel buildings completed in 1925
1925 establishments in Croatia
Neoclassical architecture in Croatia
Tourism in Zagreb